The Jarše District, or simply Jarše, is a district of the City Municipality of Ljubljana, the capital of Slovenia. It is named after the former village of Jarše, now part of the Bežigrad District.

Geography
The Jarše District is bounded on the south by the main railroad line; on the west by Šmartno Street (Šmartinska cesta), Sava Street (Savska cesta), Žale Street (Žalska cesta), the west edge of the Žale Cemetery, Jarše Street (Jarška cesta), Cleveland Street (Clevelandska ulica), and a line running between the former villages of Jarše and Obrije; on the north by the Sava River; and on the east by the A1 Freeway. The district includes the former villages of Hrastje, Obrije, Šmartno ob Savi, and Sneberje, as well as the workers' development of Zelena Jama and the Nove Jarše neighborhood.  BTC City, the largest business, shopping, recreational, entertainment and cultural centre in Europe, is located in Jarše.

References

External links

Jarše District on Geopedia
Jarše District homepage

 
Districts of Ljubljana